The 2021–22 RIT Tigers men's ice hockey season was the 58th season of play for the program, the 17th at the Division I level, and the 16th season in the Atlantic Hockey conference. The Tigers represented the Rochester Institute of Technology and were coached by Wayne Wilson, in his 23rd season.

Season
At the start of the season, Wayne Wilson was just 9 wins shy of reaching 400 for his career. RIT shot out of the gate, trying to get their coach to that mark as quickly as they could. The team's good start, which included a surprising win over ranked Notre Dame, got Wilson to the milestone in late November and had the Tigers well positioned in Atlantic Hockey.

Unfortunately, the winter break and COVID-19 delays combined to stop all of the team's momentum as RIT played just two games (both losses) over the succeeding 6 weeks. A pair of poor stretches in January and February dropped the team down around the .500 mark and saw the Tigers' switch starting goaltenders from Kolby Matthews to Frehshman, Tommy Scarfone. Scarfone had a tough beginning to his college career, allowing 6 goals in his first start (albeit on 45 shots), but made the most of his opportunities afterwards.

Despite being outscored by a fair margin during the season, RIT's 4th-place finish gave the team a home date for the conference quarterfinals and the Tigers were able to use that advantage to give them a narrow 2–1 series win over Sacred Heart. In their semifinal game, the Tigers answered goals from Air Force on three separate occasions but could not equal the score a fourth time and lost the game 3–4.

Departures

Recruiting

Roster
As of September 7, 2021.

Standings

Schedule and results

|-
!colspan=12 style=";" | Regular Season

|-
!colspan=12 style=";" | 

|- align="center" bgcolor="#e0e0e0"
|colspan=12|RIT Won Series 2–1

Scoring Statistics

Goaltending statistics

Rankings

Note: USCHO did not release a poll in week 24.

Awards and honors

References

2021–22
RIT Tigers
RIT Tigers
2021 in sports in New York (state)
2022 in sports in New York (state)